Yoru, Carmen no Shishuu (夜、カルメンの詩集) is the ninth studio album by the Japanese rock singer Kiyoharu, released on February 28, 2018. It was released in two editions: regular, with ten tracks, and limited, with eleven tracks, a DVD with three video clips and a bonus CD in which the tracks are read in the form of poetry.

Charts 
The album peaked at the nineteenth position on the Oricon charts.

Production 
The cover was created by the artist Kosuke Kawamura.

Track listing

Additional musicians 
 Duran and Koichi Korenaga - guitar
 Chiei Kobayashi - flamenco guitar
 Yuuji Okiyama - bass
 Yosuke (容昌) - percussion
 Katsuma - drums

References 

Rock albums by Japanese artists
Japanese-language albums
2018 albums